(born June 21, 1994, in Saitama, Japan) is a former Japanese pop singer, actress, model, and television personality. She first gained recognition when she joined Hello! Project Kids and later became one of the main vocalists of the Japanese idol girl group Cute which she joined in 2005 and engaged in until 2017.

Career

2002–2005: Hello! Project Kids
In 2002, Okai auditioned for Hello! Project Kids with the song "Country Road" by Yoko Honna. Her audition tape was aired on Morning Musume's variety show Hello! Morning. She was placed in the group with fourteen other girls. In the same year, she appeared in the movie Koinu Dan no Monogatari.

2005–2017: Cute 

In 2004, Berryz Kobo was created with the intention of rotating all of the members of Hello! Project Kids to make time for school, but the idea was later scrapped, and the remaining girls who were not chosen were re-branded under the name Cute on June 11, 2005.

In September 2007, Okai was added to a new unit called Athena & Robikerottsu with Risa Niigaki, Aika Mitsui, and Saki Nakajima. They sang the opening and ending theme songs for the A-1 Pictures anime Robby & Kerobby. The unit was effectively disbanded in March 2008, entering into an indefinite hiatus when the series ended.

In 2009, Okai joined a newly formed unit called Tanpopo#, a revival of former Hello! Project unit Tanpopo, with Eri Kamei, Yurina Kumai, and Aika Mitsui.

On November 9, 2010, a solo video of Okai performing the dance to Cute's then-latest single "Dance de Bakōn" was released on the group's official YouTube channel. The video received more than 100,000 views in two days, and had received over 1.2 million views by May 2011. Following the video's success, more solo "dance-cover" videos of Okai were uploaded, including her cover of Aya Matsuura's song "Love Namidairo", which was released on iTunes on November 27 as Okai's first digital single. Her first solo live event, "Chisato Okai (Cute) Solo Live 2011 Vol.1: Kaisha de Odotte Mita!!" was held on January 25, 2011, at Pacific Heaven. A CD containing Okai's cover of Miki Fujimoto's "Romantic Ukare Mode", with "Love Namidairo" as the coupling track, was sold exclusively at the venue of her second solo live, but was also released digitally as part of Hello! Project's Hello Cover series.

In August 2016, Cute announced plans to disband in June 2017. Okai expressed interest in becoming a television personality on variety shows following disbandment.

She retired from the entertainment world on April 30, 2020.

Personal life
Okia announced in April 2019 that she would be taking time off from all entertainment activities.  She noted that she had been in entertainment for 17 years, and sought to experience life from outside of the industry.

Okai's sister, Asuna Okai, was a member of Hello Pro Egg.

Discography

Singles

Digital albums
 Okai Chisato Solo Collection Vol. 2 (2012)

Other solo songs
  (February 2, 2012)
  (Cute cover) (April 18, 2012)
  (April 18, 2013)

Appearances

Movies
  (December 14, 2002)
  (June 5, 2004)
  (December 17, 2011) as Kaori Maruoka
  (2011)

TV series
  (2011) as Mai
  (2012)

TV shows
  (2002–2007)
  (2007–2008)
  (2008)
  (2008–2009)
  (2010–2011)
  (2011–2012)
  (2012–2013)
  (2013–?)

Other 
 54th NHK Kōhaku Uta Gassen — backing dancer for Aya Matsuura (December 31, 2003)

Theatrical plays
  (November 27 — December 28, 2004)
  (March 17–22, 2011)
  (2012)
  (2012)
  (2013) as Mei Koyamada

Solo events
  (January 25–26, 2011)
  (February 13–14, 2011)

YouTube
 "Dance de Bakōn!"
 "Ōkina Ai de Motenashite"
 "Forever Love"
 "Massara Blue Jeans"
 "Love Namidairo"
 "Yume Miru 15"

Photobooks

{| class="wikitable"
! No.
! Title
! Release date
|-
|align="center"| 1
| {{nihongo|Chisato"|千聖}}
 1st solo photobook
| December 24, 2010
|}

Digital photobooks
  (October 5, 2010)
 Cutest'' (Chisa Version) (March 6, 2012)
  (October 22, 2012)

Solo DVDs

References

External links 
  on YouTube

1994 births
Living people
21st-century Japanese actresses
21st-century Japanese singers
Cute (Japanese idol group) members
Japanese female idols
Japanese television personalities
Musicians from Saitama Prefecture
Tanpopo members